The Taaone Hospital (CHPF) is a public hospital in Pirae, Papeete, French Polynesia.

History
The hospital was officially opened on 25 October 2010. It was constructed with a cost of US$570 million. The hospital has been dealing with COVID-19 patients in 2020–2021. In July 2021, French President Emmanuel Macron paid a visit to the hospital. In August 2021, the hospital appealed to the president for France to send more medical personnel to French Polynesia to deal with the pandemic.

Architecture
The hospital is the largest in the territory.

References

External links
  

2010 establishments in French Polynesia
Hospitals established in 2010
Buildings and structures in French Polynesia
Hospitals in Oceania
Papeete